Noli me tangere, also known as Christ Appearing to Mary Magdalene in the Garden, is a  1525 painting by Correggio which depicts the noli me tangere interaction between Jesus and Mary Magdalene shortly after the Resurrection. It is currently in the collection of the Museo del Prado in Madrid.

History
The first mention of the painting is in the manuscript of Pietro Lamo's Graticola di Bologna, dating to around 1560 and stating it was in the house of the Ercolani counts. It is also praised by Vasari in two passages in his Lives of the Artists of 1568, once in Correggio's own biography and once in that of Girolamo da Carpi. It was seen in Bologna at the end of the 16th century by cardinal Pietro Aldobrandini, who paid a very high price to buy it.

It later passed from the Alobrandini collection to that of Ludovico Ludovisi, as shown by (for example) a postscript to Vasari's Lives by Lelio Guidiccioni: "at present the Most Illustrious Lodovisio has four other marvellous works in one room, seen by me on 7 March 1621". Little more than ten years later Prince Niccolò Ludovisi - "in the necessity of anguish" - decided to curry favour with Philip IV of Spain by giving him the best works from his collection. One of these was the Noli me tangere, which left Rome in the late 1630s or early 1640s, once a copy had been made of it. It arrived in Madrid by the end of 1643, after a brief stop in the Kingdom of Naples. It is now in the Prado Museum.

Background 
The scene is taken from events narrated near the end of the Gospel of John. 

It was Sunday, the third day after the crucifixion of Jesus. Early in the morning, while it was yet dark, a young woman made her way to the rock-hewn tomb in the garden of Joseph of Arimathea. It was Mary Magdalene, whom Jesus had rescued from a life of sin. Much had been forgiven her, therefore she loved much. In her sorrow she came to visit the spot where the body of her crucified Jesus had been laid.

Great was her surprise to find that the stone placed at the entrance of the tomb had been rolled away. In her perplexity, she ran to tell the disciples Peter and John. They all hurried back together to the garden, and the two men, entering the tomb, found it empty. Unable to explain the mystery, they presently returned home, leaving Mary still standing without the sepulchre weeping.

Description 

The picture illustrates the story of that first Easter morning. Jesus has greeted Mary by name, and she has instantly recognized the risen Christ. Sinking on her knees, she would have impulsively stretched out her hands to him, but he repels her with a gesture. Awe-struck, she gazes into his face, while he explains the message she is to carry to the disciples.

The risen Lord is clad in but one garment, a heavy mantle, knotted at the waist. The upper part is slipping from his shoulders, leaving the torso bare. The beauty of the form is reminiscent of a Greek statue. On the ground beside him are some garden tools, a hoe and a spade, and beyond these lies a straw hat. These things explain why Mary, blinded and confused with weeping, supposed that it was the gardener who spoke to her.

Christ's attitude and gesture emphasize the meaning of his words. The body sways slightly to one side, as if shrinking from Mary's touch. He still holds his right hand outstretched, as when he said "Touch me not." And now he raises his left arm, and pointing heavenward declares that he is about to ascend to his Father. He seems to speak gently as to a child, and looks down into Mary's face with a smile.

The young woman is richly arrayed in a brocade dress, cut so as to show her beautiful neck and arms. A mass of wavy golden hair falls over her shoulders and upon her bosom. Her tapering wrists and delicate hands indicate gentle blood, but her features are somewhat heavy, and the face would not attract by its beauty. The rapt expression of devotion is what makes it interesting. The whole attitude expresses complete self-forgetfulness.

The lithe and youthful figure of Christ has a high full forehead over which the parted hair is brushed in curves and a small mouth with the gentle smile. The figure in general features resembles the Christ type which is illustrated in the picture of Ecce Homo.

Analysis 
Estelle May Hurll writes: "In painting the figure of the risen Christy the old masters were accustomed to give prominence to the nail prints in hands and feet, and the wound in his side. Correggio has not done this. Such signs of suffering were inconsistent with the joyous nature of his art. The subject of the picture is entirely a happy one, and he has kept out of it all evidences of the crucifixion, emphasizing rather the idea of the ascension."

In some artistic points the picture resembles the Madonna della Scodella. The pose of Christ is similar to that of Joseph, with one arm lifted up, and the other reaching down. Thus is formed the diagonal line which is at the basis of the composition. The right arm of Mary carries the line on to the lower corner of the picture.

The landscape setting makes a spacious background, and a large tree behind Christ throws his figure into relief.

References

Sources 

 Hurll, Estelle May (1901). Correggio: A Collection of Fifteen Pictures and a Supposed Portrait of the Painter, with Introduction and Interpretation. Boston and New York: Houghton Mifflin Company, The Riverside Press Cambridge. pp. 73–78. 

Religious paintings by Correggio
1524 paintings
Paintings of the Museo del Prado by Italian artists
Correggio